The Segamat District or simply Segamat is a district in the Malaysian state of Johor. Segamat is also the name of the district's primary town.

Etymology 

It is believed that 'Segamat' is derived from the Malay phrase '', which literally translates as 'very refreshing'. According to the local folklore, the phrase was uttered by a Bendahara during the Sultanate of Malacca upon drinking the water from the Segamat River.

Geography 
The district is located in the northern part of Johor. It borders the state of Negeri Sembilan (Tampin and Jempol districts) to the northwest, the state of Pahang (Bera and Rompin districts) to the northeast, the district of Mersing to the east, the district of Kluang to the southeast, the district of Batu Pahat to the southwest and the districts of Muar and Tangkak to the west.

Segamat is the primary town in the district. Other towns, as well as villages and residential areas include:

 Segamat Baru
 Bukit Siput
 Bandar Putra (IOI)
 Taman Yayasan
 Batu Anam
 Pogoh
 Gemas Baharu
 Kampung Tengah
 Bandar Utama
 Jementah
 Buloh Kasap
 Labis
 Tenang Stesen
 Sungai Karas

There are three main rivers which flow through the district, namely the Batu Pahat River (as Simpang Kiri River), Endau River and Muar River. Other rivers include Bekok River, Chodan River, Kenawar or Genuang River, Batang Lesong River, Bongor River, Emas River, Gemas River, Jasin River, Jementah River, Labis River, Legeh River, Mempedak River, Merlimau River, Mutan River, Palong River, Paya Mengkuang River, Penarah River, Rengit River, Segamat River, Kapeh River, Selai River, Semerong River, Senarut Hilir River, Spang Loi River and Tatat River.

Administrative divisions

The district is divided into 11 subdistricts or mukims. Each mukim is administered by a headman or penghulu.

 Sungai Segamat
 Gemereh
 Bekok
 Jabi
 Sermin
 Buloh Kasap
 Jementah
 Pogoh
 Labis
 Chaah
 Gemas

Mukim Sungai Segamat is the most populous mukim in Segamat District with a population of 48,512 people. The highest population density is in Mukim Gemereh, followed by Mukim Sungai Segamat with over 200+ residents per square km. The lowest population density is in Mukim Bekok with about 50 residents per square km.

Government

The Segamat district is divided by two municipal administratives namely Segamat Municipal Council based at Segamat Town and Labis District Council seated at Labis Town.

Demographics

The annual population growth of Segamat District between 2010-2015 was 0.66%.

Federal Parliament and State Assembly Seats 

List of Segamat district representatives in the Federal Parliament (Dewan Rakyat) 

List of Segamat district representatives in the State Legislative Assembly (Dewan Undangan Negeri)

Economy
The main economy activities in the district are agriculture, agritourism, ecotourism and light manufacturing. Main agriculture produces are palm oil and rubber.

Education

Tertiary education 
The district is home to two institutions: the Johor branch of the Universiti Teknologi Mara which is located about 8 kilometres or a 10-minute drive from the town; and the Johor campus of the Tunku Abdul Rahman University College where peoples called TAR UC (previously known as KTAR) which began operating on 18 May 1998, located at an approximate 10-to-15 minutes driving distance south from the town. There is also a community college named Kolej Komuniti Segamat located at Bandar Putra IOI Segamat, a 7-kilometres drive from town, that began its operations in June 2001.

Primary and secondary education
There are about 18 primary schools in the district. On the other hand, there are 19 secondary schools within the Segamat township. Some of those notable secondary schools include SMK Dato' Bentara Dalam, SMK Agama Segamat, SMK Seri Kenangan Batu Anam, SMK Bekok, Sekolah Menengah Seg Hwa, Segamat High School and SMK Canossian Convent. While for primary school, some notable school include SK Kampong Jawa, SK Bukit Hampar, SK Bandar Putra and SK Canossion Convent.

Tourist attractions

 Segamat Square - The square was constructed in 1996 as the main venue for Johor's state level celebration of the Malaysian National Day. In 2005, when Segamat was once again chosen as the state-level host, Dataran Segamat was renovated. It also houses the clock tower and a durian replica that makes Dataran Segamat the landmark of Segamat. Location: 2°30'40"N ; 102°48'50"E.
 Taman Bunga Batu Hampar (Rock Garden) - The Rock Garden is the main recreational park in Segamat. It also houses the official residence of the District Officer of Segamat and also the Shooting Box (Istana Hinggap), Johor royal retreat. Location: 2°30'59"N ; 102°48'43"E.
 Bendahara Tepok Tomb - The tomb of the final Bendahara of Sultanate of Malacca located at Kampung Lubok Batu, about 2 km from Segamat town center via Federal Route 23. Location: 2°30'03"N ; 102°48'30"E.

Transportation

Road
Segamat district is served by the state rail network KTM with Batu Anam, Bekok, Genuang, Labis, Segamat and Tenang Stations.

Water
The district houses the Segamat Inland Port.

References

External links

 Segamat Municipal Council Official Web
  Dato Bendahara Luar